Meathead is a double album by Captain Sensible, released in September 1995 by Humbug Records. It is Sensible's fifth studio solo album and contains 32 songs across two and a half hours. The album includes studio performances by Sensible's band - featuring ex-Damned bassist Paul Gray, keyboardist Malcolm Dixon and drummer Garrie Dreadful - as well as demo recordings and instrumentals recorded mostly by Sensible on his own.

Background 

Sensible writes in the album's liner notes: "If The Universe of Geoffrey Brown was my Sgt. Pepper, then this collection of goodies is probably The White Album.... warts and all!" Meathead was recorded in a "full on experimentation mode", where "nothing was off limits", according to Sensible. He described the album as "a mixed bag of stuff including studio performances by my band, cosmic instrumentals, weird (but genuine) clips from radio and admittedly some dodgy demos that have a certain gnarled charm (ie.... too lazy to re-record)."

"Freedom" and "Pasties" were originally released in 1991 on the 12" and CD-single versions of the Damned's "Fun Factory" single.

Critical reception 

In a review for AllMusic, Richie Unterberger called Meathead "a sprawling mess of a record", saying that Sensible "seems to be taking a Zappa-like approach to his work with his combination of so many elements: bouncy London pop, Pink Floydish spacy electronics, found sound bites from TV shows, grating bulldozer guitar riffs, dainty orchestral violins, and silly lyrics about space travel. Often he seems to want to shock or jolt the listener out of complacency with repeated monster guitar licks or spoken dialogue; if the goal is to irritate, he succeeds all too well ... The listener ends up being not so much dazzled as exhausted, or worse, fed up with his apparent value of cocky experimentation over cogent, humane statements."

Track listing

Personnel 
Credits adapted from the album's liner notes.

Musicians
Captain Sensible - vocals, guitar, keyboards
Malcolm Dixon - keyboards, guitar, vocals, lead vocals ("Crazy Fish", "Love Thing", "Inventing the Wheel", "Aliens ? We Are the Aliens", "Stabilizer Jam") 
Paul Gray - bass
Garrie Dreadful - drums
Additional musicians
Howlin' Wilf - harmonica ("Freedom")
M.M. McGhee - drums ("Business Trip to Saturn")
Nial - bass ("Business Trip to Saturn")
Martin Newell - guitar ("Business Trip to Saturn")
Graham - samples, programming ("Business Trip to Saturn")
Andrew Bor - piano ("Zarbo Nebula")
Rachel Bor - cello ("Plastic Arcade"), vocals ("The Last Train")
Eric Woods - performer, arrangement ("The Snow Queen (Excerpt)")

References 

1995 albums
Captain Sensible albums